Hadera Stream, known in Arabic as Nahr Mufjir and previously also as Nahr Akhdar, is a seasonal watercourse in Israel.

The Crusaders called it the "Dead River" due to its sluggish character.

Nahal Hadera flows from the highlands in the northern West Bank and empties into the Mediterranean Sea at Hadera. The Hadera Water Park, located between Givat Olga and the Orot Rabin (Hadera) power plant, is a 750-dunam park that holds a 40-metre-wide creek banked by a 1.3-km-long promenade. A dam is being constructed where the water park meets the Coastal Highway and is supposed to prevent the rehabilitated section of the stream from being polluted by water from the watercourse itself.

References

Rivers of the West Bank
Rivers of Israel
International rivers of Asia